The Rote Jahne Solar Park in Saxony, Germany, has a total output capacity of 6 megawatts peak (MWp). Built at a former military airfield, it has 90,000 First Solar thin-film modules covering approximately 6.7 hectares, and produces approximately 5.7 million kilowatt-hours (kW·h) of solar electricity every year.  The project cost around Euro 21 million or US$28 million.

See also

Photovoltaic power stations
Solar power in Germany

References

Photovoltaic power stations in Germany
Economy of Saxony